Damien Hoyland (born 11 January 1994) is a Scottish rugby union player who plays for Edinburgh Rugby in the United Rugby Championship. 

Hoyland made his professional debut for Edinburgh in their Guinness PRO12 clash at home to Ospreys in 2015, with his international bow coming during the 2015 summer test victory over Italy. His first international try came in a 2017 summer test, also against Italy.

Age grade rugby

The James Gillespie's HS former pupil represented Scotland under-17 as well as Edinburgh at under-16, under-17 and under-18 levels.  He was part of the Scotland under-17 Sevens team which took part in the Youth Commonwealth Games on the Isle of Man in 2011.

Sevens

In February 2015, he was named in the Wellington Sevens World Rugby dream team, after scoring seven tries, which made him the events top try scorer.

International

Hoyland made his full international debut in the summer of 2015, and to date has garnered four caps. He scored his first test try during a 2017 summer victory over Italy.

References

1994 births
Living people
Scottish rugby union players
People educated at James Gillespie's High School
Edinburgh Rugby players
Scotland international rugby sevens players
Male rugby sevens players
Scotland international rugby union players
Rugby union players from Edinburgh
Rugby union wings
Rugby union fullbacks